Justina Milagros Machado (born September 6, 1972) is an American actress, known for her roles as Penelope Alvarez on the Netflix and Pop TV sitcom One Day at a Time, Darci Factor in The CW dramedy Jane the Virgin, Vanessa Diaz on the HBO drama Six Feet Under, and Brenda on the USA drama Queen of the South.

Early life
Machado was born in Chicago, Illinois, one of two children of Alicia Morales Ruiz and Ismael Machado. Her mother was born in Puerto Rico and her father was born to Puerto Rican parents. They subsequently divorced and her mother remarried and had three children. Her family roots are in Barceloneta, Puerto Rico and Barrio Jagual, Patillas, Puerto Rico, and her ancestry includes Afro-Latino. As Machado is of Hispanic descent, she had a traditional quinceañera, with chambelanes as well as damas. She said her family was poor, and she grew up in the Northwest Side of Chicago. Machado was raised Catholic.

Machado was very active in drama, always participating in her school plays. She also took dance at Franklin Fine Arts Center. In 1986, Machado attended Lane Technical College Prep High School. During her spare time, she performed with the Latino Chicago Theater Company.

Machado was a guest appearing in Episode 6 of Season 6 of "Finding Your Roots", a documentary show by PBS that is hosted by Dr. Henry Louis Gates, Jr., during which it was confirmed that she has African matrilineal ancestry (i.e. through a female ancestor on her mother's side) through genetic testing of her mitochondrial DNA.

Career
In 1990, after graduating from Lane Tech, Machado moved to New York City. The experience she had gained as a performer with the Latino Chicago Theater Company helped open the doors for her in that city. Soon, she was offered a job as a professional actress in Los Angeles, California. Machado moved to Los Angeles and in 1996, she landed her first two acting roles. She was cast as "Elsa" in the TV series NYPD Blue episode #311, and she was also cast as "Val Cho" in the movie made for television No One Would Tell.

Television
On June 10, 2001, Machado auditioned for the TV series Six Feet Under and was cast as Vanessa Diaz, originally a supporting character, later evolving into one of the series' main characters. Machado and her cast mates were honored with a Screen Actors Guild Award for "Outstanding Performance by an Ensemble in a Drama Series". The series completed its final season in 2005.

She has also appeared in the Canadian television series, 1-800-Missing, as a character named Sunny Estrada.

In 2009, she appeared in nine episodes on the series ER as Chicago police officer Claudia Diaz. Machado also appeared in Body of Proof as villainess Emily Burrows, and recurred on Devious Maids as Zoila's sister, Reina. Machado also recurred as Brenda in the USA crime drama series Queen of the South.

 In the 2017 remake of One Day at a Time, Machado has received positive reviews for her role as a single mother raising two children and struggling with PTSD after serving in Afghanistan. Before this, Machado began portraying the recurring role of Darci Factor in The CW drama series Jane the Virgin.

Machado guest starred on the NBC comedy series Superstore playing new district manager Maya, with whom Amy Sosa shares a surprising connection.

After having been announced to portray Florence Johnston in the first Live in Front of a Studio Audience’s The Jeffersons portion, instead reprised by Marla Gibbs, Machado was cast in the second edition in December 2019 as Teresa Betancourt from All in the Family.

On September 2, 2020, Machado was announced as one of the celebrities competing on the 29th season of Dancing with the Stars, partnered with professional dancer, Sasha Farber. Machado finished in fourth place on November 23, 2020. In 2021, Machado was a singing bust in Muppets Haunted Mansion.

Film
Machado has participated in over 15 films. Amongst her most notable roles so far have been Carmen Rodriguez in She's So Lovely, Isabella Hudson in Final Destination 2, Agent Henderson in Torque, Natalia in Little Fugitive, Teresa in Man Maid, Sofia in The Accidental Husband, Tanya in The Purge: Anarchy, and FBI Agent Rosie Gomez in the film In the Electric Mist.

Theater
Machado has also made appearances on stage, including a 2008 production of Neil LaBute's play, Some Girl(s), at the Geffen Playhouse in Los Angeles. She was in productions of Blade to the Heat and Black Butterfly at the Mark Taper Forum in Los Angeles. She was the first replacement for Andréa Burns in Broadway's In the Heights. In 2010, Machado appeared in the Los Angeles run of Love, Loss and What I Wore.

Other work
In 2003, Machado appeared in the music video for TLC's song "Damaged", the third single from their fourth studio album 3D, as a young woman trapped in an abusive relationship and unsure of what to do with her life.

In 2020, Jacob Vargas and Justina Machado were Masters of Ceremonies at the National Hispanic Media Coalition Impact Awards.

Filmography

Film

Television

Voice roles

See also

 List of Puerto Ricans
 Puerto Ricans in Chicago

References

External links
 
 

1972 births
Actresses from Chicago
American actresses of Puerto Rican descent
American film actresses
American television actresses
Hispanic and Latino American actresses
Living people
People of Afro–Puerto Rican descent
20th-century American actresses
21st-century American actresses
20th-century African-American women
20th-century African-American people
21st-century African-American women
21st-century African-American people